West Island line and South Island line may refer to several Hong Kong MTR lines:

 West Island line, an extension of the Island line westwards from Sheung Wan to Kennedy Town stations
 South Island line, a line from Admiralty to South Horizon stations
 South Island line (West), a proposed line from HKU to Wong Chuk Hang stations

See also
 History of the South Island line and West Island line

Transport disambiguation pages